Kallik (also Romanized as Kallīk and Kalīk; also known as Kahlak and Kāleh) is a village in Mehraban-e Sofla Rural District, Gol Tappeh District, Kabudarahang County, Hamadan Province, Iran. At the 2006 census, its population was 383, in 88 families.

References 

Populated places in Kabudarahang County